Saint-Angel is a commune in the Corrèze department in central France.

Geography
The Triouzoune flows south-southeast through the commune and forms part of its southeastern boundary.

Population

See also
Communes of the Corrèze department

References

Communes of Corrèze